CBIA may refer to:

 CBQR-FM
 Cobyrinate a,c-diamide synthase, an enzyme